Neoterebra sterigmoides is a species of sea snail, a marine gastropod mollusk in the family Terebridae, the auger snails.

Description

Distribution

References

External links
 Simone, L. R. L. & Gracia, C. A. (2006). Two new species of Terebra (Gastropoda, Conoidea) from Colombia. Papeis Avulsos de Zoologia. 46(11): 125-133
 Fedosov, A. E.; Malcolm, G.; Terryn, Y.; Gorson, J.; Modica, M. V.; Holford, M.; Puillandre, N. (2020). Phylogenetic classification of the family Terebridae (Neogastropoda: Conoidea). Journal of Molluscan Studies

Terebridae
Gastropods described in 2006